Nicholas Fanti (born December 30, 1996) is an American professional baseball pitcher who is a free agent. He was drafted by the Philadelphia Phillies in the 31st round of the 2015 Major League Baseball Draft.

Career
Fanti attended Hauppauge High School in Hauppauge, New York. As a senior, he pitched consecutive no-hitters for the school's baseball team. In his senior year, he won the Carl Yastrzemski Award, given to the best high school baseball player in Suffolk County. He committed to attend Marist College.

The Philadelphia Phillies selected Fanti in the 31st round of the 2015 MLB draft. He signed with the Phillies, and made his professional debut with the Gulf Coast Phillies of the Rookie-level Gulf Coast League after he signed, posting a 2.55 ERA in 1.72 innings. He also pitched for the Gulf Coast Phillies in 2016, going 7-0 with a 1.57 ERA in 11 games. Fanti pitched for the Italian national baseball team in the 2017 World Baseball Classic.

Pitching for the Lakewood BlueClaws of the Class A South Atlantic League in 2017, Fanti pitched the first  innings of a no-hitter on May 6. He threw a no-hitter on July 17, allowing just one base runner against the Charleston RiverDogs, becoming the first Blueclaws pitcher to throw a complete-game, no-hitter since 2002. In 21 total games for Lakewood, he posted a 9-2 record and 2.54 ERA.

In 2018, Fanti made 6 starts for the High-A Clearwater Threshers, posting a 3-3 record and 7.22 ERA with 18 strikeouts in 28.2 innings pitched. Fanti signed with the Sydney Blue Sox of the Australian Baseball League for the 2018/19 season.

Fanti missed the entire 2019 season while dealing with a shoulder injury. He did not play in a game in 2020 due to the cancellation of the minor league season because of the COVID-19 pandemic. On May 1, 2021, Fanti underwent Tommy John surgery and missed the entire 2021 season. On November 7, 2021, Fanti elected free agency.

On May 24, 2022, Fanti re-signed with the Phillies on a minor league contract and was assigned to the Florida Complex League Phillies. However, he did not make an appearance for the organization and was released on August 1.

Personal life
Fanti has four older sisters.

References

External links

1996 births
Living people
Sportspeople from Smithtown, New York
Baseball players from New York (state)
Baseball pitchers
Florida Complex League Phillies players
2017 World Baseball Classic players
Lakewood BlueClaws players
Sydney Blue Sox players
American people of Italian descent
American expatriate baseball players in Australia